Joshua Morgan Hancock (April 11, 1978 – April 29, 2007) was a professional baseball pitcher, who played Major League Baseball (MLB) for the Boston Red Sox, Philadelphia Phillies, Cincinnati Reds, and St. Louis Cardinals. He was killed in an auto accident on April 29, 2007 at the age of 29.

Career
Born in Cleveland, Mississippi, Hancock graduated from Vestavia Hills High School in Vestavia Hills, Alabama. After high school, he was selected in the fourth round of the 1996 Major League Baseball draft by the Milwaukee Brewers, but did not sign. An Alabama fan, Hancock instead attended college at Auburn University in Auburn, Alabama because the Tigers offered him a better scholarship. Hancock was selected by the Boston Red Sox in the fifth round (155th overall) of the 1998 amateur draft and signed with the Red Sox, making his major-league debut on September 10, 2002. In December 2002 Hancock was traded to the Philadelphia Phillies for Jeremy Giambi. On July 30, 2004, he was traded along with  Andy Machado to the Cincinnati Reds for Todd Jones and Brad Correll.  The next day, Hancock was the winning pitcher for the Reds in a game against the Houston Astros (a suspended game that began the day before while he was still with the Phillies).

On the first day of Spring training 2006, Hancock was released by the Reds for being 17 pounds overweight — thus, violating a clause in his contract. He promptly signed with the St. Louis Cardinals and had his best season, pitching 77 innings, compiling a 4.09 earned run average ERA, and appearing in the 2006 postseason with the Cardinals. Hancock performed in a variety of roles for the Cardinals' bullpen, from short term relief appearances to less desirable roles when the game was out of hand.

Hancock was on the Cardinals roster for the 2006 World Series but did not pitch.

Before coming to the Cardinals,  Hancock had a penchant for giving up home runs. He gave up 17 homers over 68 innings pitched in 2005. Hancock improved in 2006, giving up only nine over 77 innings. In 2007, he had pitched 8 games with an 0-1 record and a 3.55 ERA.

Death
 

On April 29, 2007, Hancock was killed in a motor vehicle accident when the 2007 Ford Explorer he was driving while intoxicated struck the rear of a flat bed tow truck at 12:35 a.m. Central Time. The truck was reportedly in the left lane assisting another vehicle that was involved in a prior accident.

A police report revealed that Hancock was intoxicated at the time of his fatal accident with a blood-alcohol level of 0.157, nearly double the legal limit in Missouri. Police found 10.95 grams of marijuana and a pipe in his vehicle, although toxicology reports came back revealing that there was no marijuana in his system. Hancock was texting on his cell phone when the accident occurred, and was not wearing a seatbelt. An accident reconstruction team determined that Hancock was driving  in a  zone.

The Cardinals' scheduled game with the Chicago Cubs later that day was postponed due to his accident. The game was eventually made up on September 15, a 3-2 Cubs victory.

Hancock's death marked the second time in five years a player for the Cardinals died during the baseball season, the first being of pitcher Darryl Kile in 2002 with a coronary artery blockage. He was the second active MLB player to be killed in an accident in less than a year, after the plane crash of Yankees pitcher Cory Lidle.

Three days earlier, his teammates were concerned when they could not reach Hancock after he had overslept and had not shown up for the game on time, likening it to the events leading up to the sudden death of Kile. Hancock did not answer until the "20th call", having thought the start time was later than it actually was. Hancock was expected to be fined by the Cardinals after the incident.

On May 31, 2007, it was reported that Hancock had been involved in another accident involving his GMC Denali three nights before his fatal crash involving a rented Ford Explorer. 
Hancock's final appearance for the team was April 28, 2007, giving up one run in three innings of relief.

Aftermath
The Cardinals wore a special patch on their uniform sleeves with Hancock's number (32) for the duration of the 2007 season to commemorate his life.
 Although his number is not retired, he is currently honored with his number being displayed above his name in the Cardinals bullpen at Busch Stadium, alongside Darryl Kile, who died in 2002.

In the wake of Hancock's accident, several teams banned alcohol from their home clubhouses.  The Florida Marlins had already implemented this policy several seasons before Hancock's death, saying that they wanted to keep their players from driving home intoxicated after home games.  They did not ban alcohol from visiting clubhouses because their opponents usually ride a team bus after playing away games.  In 2006, after Esteban Loaiza was arrested for drunk driving, Oakland A's GM Billy Beane banned alcohol in both clubhouses, saying it was a liability issue. After Hancock died, the Baltimore Orioles implemented a similar policy, at least on a temporary basis.

Hancock's family filed a lawsuit on May 24, 2007 against Mike Shannon's restaurant, the tow truck company, tow truck driver, and the driver of the car that the tow truck was stopped to help.
On May 31, 2007, the Missouri Division of Alcohol and Tobacco Control announced results of an investigation revealed no wrongdoing on the part of employees at Mike Shannon's Steaks and Seafood restaurant in Hancock's death.

The lawsuit was dropped on July 30, 2007.

See also
 List of baseball players who died during their careers
MLB.com  tribute
Sports E-Cyclopedia's Memorium to Josh Hancock
PDF file of Dean Hancock's lawsuit

References

External links

Josh Hancock at Pura Pelota (Venezuelan Professional Baseball League)

1978 births
2007 deaths
Auburn Tigers baseball players
Augusta GreenJackets players
Baseball players from Mississippi
Boston Red Sox players
Cincinnati Reds players
Gulf Coast Red Sox players
Louisville Bats players
Lowell Spinners players
Major League Baseball pitchers
Mesa Desert Dogs players
Navegantes del Magallanes players
American expatriate baseball players in Venezuela
Pawtucket Red Sox players
People from Cleveland, Mississippi
People from Vestavia Hills, Alabama
Philadelphia Phillies players
Road incident deaths in Missouri
Sarasota Red Sox players
Scranton/Wilkes-Barre Red Barons players
St. Louis Cardinals players
Trenton Thunder players